Apsaustodon segregatus is a species of beetle in the family Carabidae, the only species in the genus Apsaustodon.

References

Pterostichinae
Monotypic Carabidae genera